Sì is the sixteenth studio album by Italian tenor Andrea Bocelli, released on 26 October 2018. It is Bocelli's first album of original material in 14 years, his last being Andrea (2004). Bocelli duets with his son Matteo Bocelli on "Fall on Me", and Ed Sheeran provides vocals on and also co-wrote "Amo soltanto te", which marks the second collaboration between Bocelli and Sheeran after the latter's "Perfect Symphony" in 2017. Dua Lipa and Josh Groban also appear on the album.

The deluxe edition of the album includes several bonus tracks, while another deluxe edition adds a bonus disc featuring mostly Spanish versions of the main tracks, as well as a French version of "Ali di libertà" and a Mandarin version of "If Only" with Taiwanese singer A-Mei. The album was BBC Radio 2's Album of the Week, with several of the tracks making their world premieres on the network.

The album debuted at number one on the UK Albums Chart and US Billboard 200, becoming Bocelli's first number-one album in both countries. It is the first classical album to peak at number one in 20 years in the United Kingdom and 10 years in the United States. Si was nominated for the Grammy Award for Best Traditional Pop Vocal Album at the 62nd Annual Grammy Awards.

On 8 November 2019, Bocelli released Si Forever: The Diamond Edition, an extended deluxe edition of the album featuring five new tracks including duets with Ellie Goulding and Jennifer Garner.

Background
Bocelli stated that he and his team of songwriters and producers have found and set aside songs to work on for years, but did not actually record them until Sì. Bocelli explained that as his family is the "most important reference point in his life", he wanted to "celebrate" them on the album—including his son Matteo on "Fall on Me", while his other son Amos contributes piano on the two acoustic bonus tracks, and the song "Vivo" is dedicated to Bocelli's wife Veronica.

Promotion
"Fall on Me" also appears over the end credits of the Disney film The Nutcracker and the Four Realms, the soundtrack of which was released the same day as Sì.

Commercial performance
Sì debuted atop the US Billboard 200 with 126,000 album-equivalent units (of which 123,000 were pure album sales). It is Bocelli's first US number-one album, and the first classical album to do so since Josh Groban's Noël in January 2008.

In the United Kingdom, Sì debuted at number one with sales of 25,829 copies, making it Bocelli's 11th top 10 album. It is also the first classical album to reach the top since James Horner's album Titanic: Music from the Motion Picture in 1998.

Track listing

Charts

Weekly charts

Year-end charts

Certifications

See also
 List of artists who have achieved simultaneous UK and US number-one hits
 List of Billboard 200 number-one albums of 2018
 List of UK Albums Chart number ones of the 2010s

References

2018 albums
Andrea Bocelli albums